The Bayer designation ζ Lyrae (Zeta Lyrae, ζ Lyr) is shared by two stars in the constellation Lyra:
ζ1 Lyrae (6 Lyrae), an Am star
ζ2 Lyrae (7 Lyrae), an F0 subgiant

Lyrae, Zeta
Lyra (constellation)